The 356th Fighter Group  is an inactive United States Air Force organization. Its last assignment was with the Army Service Forces, being stationed at Camp Kilmer, New Jersey. It was inactivated on 10 November 1945.

During World War II the group was an Eighth Air Force fighter unit stationed in England. Assigned to RAF Martlesham Heath in 1943. Despite excellent leadership had highest ratio of losses to enemy aircraft claims of all Eighth Air Force fighter groups. It earned a Distinguished Unit Citation for actions on 17, 18, and 23 September 1944 for support of Operation Market-Garden airborne forces in the Netherlands.

History
 See 118th Airlift Wing for additional lineage and history information
Organized and trained in the Northeast United States by First Air Force. During training was part of the air defense of the northeast, being attached to the New York and Boston Fighter Wings.

The group flew P-47 Thunderbolts until they were replaced by P-51 Mustangs in November 1944. Aircraft of the 356th were identified by a magenta/blue diamond pattern around their cowling.

The group consisted of the following squadrons:

 359th Fighter Squadron (OC) 12 December 1942 – 10 November 1945
 360th Fighter Squadron (PI) 12 December 1942 – 10 November 1945
 361st Fighter Squadron (QI) 12 December 1942 – 10 November 1945

From October 1943 until January 1944, operated as escort for B-17 Flying Fortress/B-24 Liberator bombers that attacked such objectives as industrial areas, missile sites, airfields, and communications.

Fighters from the 356th engaged primarily in bombing and strafing missions after 3 January 1944, with its targets including U-boat installations, barges, shipyards, aerodromes, hangars, marshalling yards, locomotives, trucks, oil facilities, flak towers, and radar stations. Bombed and strafed in the Arnhem area on 17, 18, and 23 September 1944 to neutralize enemy gun emplacements, and received a Distinguished Unit Citation for this contribution to the airborne attack on the Netherlands.

In early 1945, group's P-51 Mustangs clashed with German Me 262 jet aircraft. The group flew its last combat mission, escorting B-17's dropping propaganda leaflets, on 7 May 1945. It returned to Camp Kilmer New Jersey and was inactivated on 10 November 1945.

Redesignated 118th Fighter Group. Allotted to Tennessee Air National Guard on 24 May 1946

Lineage
 Constituted as 356th Fighter Group on 8 December 1942
 Activated on 12 December 1942
 Inactivated on 10 November 1945.
 Redesignated 118th Fighter Group. Allotted to ANG (Tennessee) on 24 May 1946

Assignments
 I Fighter Command, 12 December 1942 – 15 August 1943
 Attached to: New York Fighter Wing 30 May – 4 July 1943
 Attached to: Boston Fighter Wing 4 July – 15 August 1943
 65th Fighter Wing, 26 August 1943
 67th Fighter Wing, 8 August 1944
 Attached to: 1st Bombardment (later Air) Division, 15 September 1944 – 2 November 1945
 Army Service Forces (for inactivation), 4–10 November 1945

Stations
 Westover Field, Massachusetts, 12 December 1942
 Groton Army Airfield, Connecticut, 12 March 1943
 Mitchel Field, New York, 30 May 1943
 Grenier Field, New Hampshire, 4 July – 15 August 1943
 RAF Goxhill (USAAF Station 345), England, 27 August 1943
 RAF Martlesham Heath (USAAF Station 369), England, 5 October 1943 – 4 November 1945
 Camp Kilmer, New Jersey, 9–10 November 1945

References

External links
Captain John Pershing Perrin DFC, 1943/44 356th FG/361st Fighter Squadron Ace – who died so others might live
Wartime air crash. Perrin Memorial
John Perrin, Class of '40 The Rutgers Oral History Archives

Fighter groups of the United States Army Air Forces
Military units and formations established in 1942